The 37th UIT World Shooting Championships was the contemporary name of the ISSF World Shooting Championships in all ISSF shooting events that were held in Moscow, Russia, the Soviet Union in 1958. For the first time ever, specific women's and junior events (50 metre rifle three positions and 50+100 metre rifle prone) were included.

Medal count

Rifle events

Men

Women

Pistol events

Shotgun events

Running target events

References 

ISSF World Shooting Championships
ISSF
S
ISSF World Shooting Championships
1958 in Russia
1958 in Moscow
Sports competitions in Moscow
Shooting competitions in Russia